Wedding Group is a 1936 British drama film directed by Alex Bryce and Campbell Gullan and starring Fay Compton, Patric Knowles and Barbara Greene. It was made at Wembley Studios as a quota quickie. The film was released in the US under the title Wrath of Jealousy.

Cast
 Fay Compton as Florence Nightingale  
 Patric Knowles as Robert Smith  
 Barbara Greene as Janet Graham  
 Alastair Sim as Angus Graham  
 Bruce Seton as Dr. Jock Carnegie  
 Ethel Glendinning as Margaret Graham  
 Arthur Young as Dr. Granger  
 Naomi Plaskitt as Jessie, the Maid  
 David Hutcheson as George Harkness 
 Michael Wilding as Dr. Hutherford  
 Derek Blomfield
 Polly Emery
 Billy Dear

References

Bibliography
 Chibnall, Steve. Quota Quickies: The Birth of the British 'B' Film. British Film Institute, 2007.
 Low, Rachael. Filmmaking in 1930s Britain. George Allen & Unwin, 1985.
 Wood, Linda. British Films, 1927-1939. British Film Institute, 1986.

External links

1936 films
British drama films
1936 drama films
Films directed by Alex Bryce
Films directed by Campbell Gullan
Quota quickies
Films shot at Wembley Studios
20th Century Fox films
British black-and-white films
1930s English-language films
1930s British films